Steven Humphries may refer to:

 R. Stephen Humphreys, American historian of Southwest Asia and North Africa
 Stephen Humphrey (2013–2021), American politician
 Stephen Humphrey Bogart (born 1949), American writer, producer, and businessman
 Stephen Humphries (fl. 1981), author of Hooligans or Rebels? An Oral History of Working-Class Childhood and Youth, 1889–1939
 Stephen Humphrys (born 1997), English professional footballer
 Steve Humphries (born 1961), English former footballer